Lemuel Cook (September 10, 1759 – May 20, 1866) was one of the last verifiable surviving veterans of the American Revolutionary War.

Early life and education
Cook was born on September 10, 1759, in Litchfield County, Connecticut, to Henry Cook and his wife Hannah Benham.

Military service
Cook enlisted in the Continental Army in 1775 at the age of 16. He was assigned to the 2nd Continental Light Dragoons, and by his death he was the last surviving member. He fought at Brandywine and in the Virginian campaign, and was wounded several times. He was present at Charles Cornwallis' surrender in October 1781. He received an honorable discharge signed by George Washington on June 12, 1784.

Later life and death
Following the war, Cook became a farmer and married Hannah Curtis. They had seven sons and three daughters.

He was an active Mason and Democrat since the party’s establishment in 1828. His church was Congregational. He lived in Plymouth, Connecticut (then Northbury) until 1790, when he moved to Clinton, New York. In 1795 he returned to Plymouth, then moved to Pompey, New York in 1805. He moved to North Bergen, New York in 1821 and finally to Clarendon, New York in 1832.

Lemuel was one of the oldest and among the last living pensioners of the American Revolution. He died May 20, 1866, at the age of 106, having lived to see the start and the end of the American Civil War. He was buried with full military and Masonic honors. At the time of his death, only three other revolutionary veterans (Samuel Downing, Daniel F. Bakeman and John Gray) were still alive.

Photography
He was one of seven American Revolutionary War veterans who, having survived into the age of photography, were featured in the 1864 book The Last Men of the Revolution, which gives many details of his life.

See also

Last surviving United States war veterans

References

Further reading
Reverend E.B. Hillard, The Last Men of the Revolution (1864), republished 1968 with additional notes by Wendell Garrett.
Don N. Hagist, "The Revolution's Last Men: The Soldiers Behind the Photographs, Hardcover – April 6, 2015

External links
Lemuel Cook: Last Survivor of the Revolutionary War from a Burr/Cook genealogy page
Burial site of Lemuel Cook at Find a Grave

1759 births
1866 deaths
American centenarians
Men centenarians
Continental Army soldiers
United States Army soldiers
People from Litchfield County, Connecticut
People from Clarendon, New York